Cutzamala de Pinzón is a city, and the seat of Cutzamala de Pinzón Municipality, in the Mexican state of Guerrero. As of 2020 the town has a population of 4,717. It is located in the far northwestern part of the state, on the border with Michoacán.

Etymology 
The name Cutzamala comes from a Nahuatl word cutzamallot meaning "rainbow"; hence, "Place of Rainbows.” It was known to Purepecha speakers as "Apatzingani,” which has the same meaning. An alternative theory suggests it is derived from the Nahuatl word cutzamatl, meaning "weasel."

History

19th Century 
The first battle in the Tierra Caliente region happened in Cutzamala in 1810. In 1860, during the Reform War, Cutzamala was besieged by the Liberals with a force of 4,500 men in the Siege of Cutzamala. The Liberals eventually won the town.

Eutimio Pinzón, often considered the hero of Cutzamala, was the general who defended the town during the Second French Intervention in Mexico in 1874.

Demographics 

The population of Cutzamala as of 2020 is 4,717.

References

 1st. Official Webpage
 http://cutzamala.mexico.org
https://web.archive.org/web/20070929022209/http://www.cutzamala.com/modules.php?name=historia
http://www.cutzamala.com

Populated places in Guerrero